Saadallah Al Jabiri (1893–1947) was a Syrian Arab politician, a two-time prime minister and a two-time Minister of Foreign Affairs and Expatriates of Syria.
Jabiri was exiled by the French authorities to the village of Douma in North Lebanon, where he rented the house of Melhim Kheir. 
His sister, Fayza Al Jabiri, was married to Riad Al Solh, two-time prime minister of Lebanon.

Saadallah al-Jabiri Square in central Aleppo city is named after the statesman.

References

Al-Jabiri family
1890s births
1948 deaths
Prime Ministers of Syria
Foreign ministers of Syria
Speakers of the People's Assembly of Syria
National Bloc (Syria) politicians
People from Aleppo
Syrian Arab nationalists
Mekteb-i Mülkiye alumni
Syrian ministers of defense
20th-century Syrian politicians